The 2020–21 Women's EHF Champions League knockout stage began on 6 March and ended on 30 May 2021 with the final at the László Papp Budapest Sports Arena in Budapest, Hungary, to decide the winners of the 2020–21 Women's EHF Champions League. On 10 February 2021, after a decision by the EHF Executive Committee, it was announced that all 16 teams advanced from the group stage.

Format
In the round of 16, the first-placed team from one group faced the eighth-placed team from the other group, the second-placed team faced the seventh-placed and so on. The eight winning teams advance to the quarterfinals. The four quarterfinal winners qualified for the final four tournament at the László Papp Budapest Sports Arena in Budapest, Hungary.

Qualified teams

Round of 16

Overview

|}

Matches

CSM Bucureşti won 54–51 on aggregate.

Brest Bretagne won 63–54 on aggregate.

ŽRK Budućnost won 50–48 on aggregate.

Vipers Kristiansand won 65–62 on aggregate.

Rostov-Don won 71–44 on aggregate.

Győri Audi ETO KC won 69–48 on aggregate.

CSKA Moscow won 47–46 on aggregate.

Quarterfinals

Overview

|}

Matches

51–51 on aggregate. CSKA Moscow won on away goals.

Brest Bretagne won 60–50 on aggregate.

Győri Audi ETO KC won 54–40 on aggregate.

Vipers Kristiansand won 57–50 on aggregate.

Final four
The final four was held at the László Papp Budapest Sports Arena in Budapest, Hungary on 29 and 30 May 2021. The draw was made on 13 April 2021.

Bracket

Semifinals

Third place game

Final

Notes

References

External links
Final4 Official website 

knockout stage